Tavaerua is one of 22 islands in the Aitutaki atoll of the Cook Islands. It is located on the eastern perimeter of Aitutaki Lagoon to the south of the smaller island of Tavaeruaiti, four kilometres to the east of the main island of Aitutaki.

References

Islands of Aitutaki